KJXK (102.7 FM, "102.7 Jack FM") is a commercial radio station in San Antonio, Texas, broadcasting an adult hits radio format using the "Jack FM" brand.  It is owned by Alpha Media with radio studios on Eisenhauer Road in Northeast San Antonio.

KJXK has an effective radiated power (ERP) of 100,000 watts, currently the maximum for American FM stations.  The transmitter is atop Tower of the Americas in downtown San Antonio, off Cesar Chavez Boulevard.

History

Progressive Rock
102.7 had its initial construction permit issued on November 20, 1967, as the FM counterpart of KTSA 550 AM. On June 7, 1968, it was given the call sign KTSA-FM, which was shortened to KTFM prior to sign-on. It was originally owned by Waterman Broadcasting of Texas and it largely simulcast KTSA.

In 1972, management to switch KTFM to progressive rock.  This format lasted until 1976, when it shifted towards a more structured album rock format, playing the most popular tracks from top selling albums.

Top 40
In 1980, the station dropped its album rock format for Top 40/CHR. Its Top 40 format would later evolve into a Rhythmic Top 40 formula in late 1988. KTFM was one of three dominant Top 40 stations in San Antonio, competing with the other two dominant CHR stations, 96.1 KSAQ (now KXXM) and KITY “Power 93” (now Regional Mexican "Que Buena" KROM 92.9).

In March 2000, Waterman reached a deal to sell KTFM and KTSA to Infinity Broadcasting for $90 million, as Waterman was looking to focus solely on its television assets. That same year, the Top 40 market would be shaken up by the arrival of a move-in at the 98.5 FM frequency. KBBT was launched as "The Beat", with a Rhythmic format featuring hip-hop music.  The Beat quickly climbed up in the ratings.

In August 2001, KTFM decided to challenge KBBT by changing from Mainstream Top 40 to a more rhythmic-leaning sound as "Wild 102-7". KBBT had the hip hop audience, and KTFM started to see its ratings decline.

K-Rock and Jack FM
On October 24, 2003, KTFM dropped the Top 40 format after 17 years and flipped to Mainstream rock as "102.7 K-Rock."  The call letters became KSRX. The first song on "K-Rock" was "Welcome to the Jungle" by Guns N' Roses.   But 99.5 KISS-FM was the veteran rock station in San Antonio and KSRX was unable to compete for rock listeners.

On January 1, 2006, after a brief "Free FM" stunt, KSRX became "102.7 Jack FM."  It changed its call letters to KJXK started playing adult hits with no disc jockeys, just the quips from the voice of Jack.  The first song on Jack FM was "Get Ready for This" by 2 Unlimited.

Changes in Ownership
In August 2006, CBS Radio sold KJXK and KTSA to Border Media Partners (BMP) for $45 million. Meanwhile, BMP revived the KTFM calls in 2005 on 94.1 FM, which has since reverted to its well-known Top 40 format.

On October 14, 2013, BMP sold KJXK and the rest of its San Antonio cluster to L&L Broadcasting (now Alpha Media) for $31 million. The transaction closed on January 31, 2014.

On January 7, 2016, at 4 p.m., after a half-hour of "goodbye"-themed songs (ending with "Someone like You" by Adele), KJXK briefly stunted with country music.  During the stunt, it kept the “Jack FM” name, but included barnyard sounds in the bumpers and branded the Facebook page as "102.7 Yeehaw FM". As 94.1 KTFM was stunting at the same time, this led listeners to believe KTFM was moving back to 102.7 FM.  However, at 5 p.m., “Jack” returned, and the country music was revealed to be a publicity stunt.

References

External links

Jack FM stations
JXK
Adult hits radio stations in the United States
Radio stations established in 1969
1969 establishments in Texas
Alpha Media radio stations